Moitaka is a suburb of Port Moresby, the capital city of Papua New Guinea. It contains the Moitaka Wildlife Sanctuary.

Suburbs of Port Moresby